Perimeceta leucosticta is a moth in the family Crambidae. It was described by George Hampson in 1919. It is found on New Guinea, where it has been recorded from Fergusson Island.

References

Moths described in 1919
Hoploscopini